Crossroads: Hymns of Faith is a studio album by American country artist Janie Fricke. It was released on August 15, 1992, via Branson Entertainment and featured 12 tracks. It was the seventeenth studio album released in Fricke's career and her first album of gospel music. Its tracks were covers of gospel material originally recorded by other artists.

Background and recording
After over a decade at Columbia Records and eight number one country hits, Janie Fricke moved to Intersound Records in the early 1990s. Her first release for the label was a 1991 eponymous album. Following its release, Fricke moved to the label's subsidiary company Branson Entertainment. The label was designed specifically for country artists who were performing in Branson, Missouri, an American city where veteran artists could perform concerts to fans. 

Fricke was a frequent performer of Branson, Missouri and often included gospel selections in her concert set. Fans of her Branson performances encouraged Fricke to record an album of gospel material which prompted the creation of Crossroads: Hymns of Faith. The album was recorded at the Chelsea Studio, located in Nashville, Tennessee. The album was the first in Fricke's career to be self-produced. It also featured Ed Keeley as an executive producer on the project.

Content, release and reception

Crossroads: Hymns of Faith contained a total of 12 tracks. A majority of the disc was traditional gospel songs such as "Amazing Grace", "The Old Rugged Cross" and "Swing Low, Sweet Chariot". Additionally, Fricke also covers Kris Kristofferson's "Why Me Lord" and Eric Clapton's "Tears in Heaven". Crossroads was originally released on August 15, 1992, on Branson Entertainment. It was Fricke's seventeenth studio collection. It was distributed by Branson as both a compact disc and cassette. Years later, the album was reissued to digital platforms including Apple Music. The album was given two out of five stars from AllMusic.

Track listings

Compact disc and digital versions

Cassette version

Personnel
All credits are adapted from the liner notes of Crossroads: Hymns of Faith and AllMusic.

Musical personnel
 Janie Fricke - lead vocals
 Lea Jane Berinati – backing vocals
 Doug Clements – backing vocals
 Sonny Garrish – steel guitar
 Vicki Hampton – backing vocals
 Jerry Kroon – drums
 Gary Lunn – bass
 Charlie McCoy – harmonica
 Tony Migliore – keyboards
 Cindy Walker Richardson – backing vocals
 Mike Severs – acoustic guitar, electric guitar
 Dennis Wilson – backing vocals
 Curtis Young – backing vocals

Technical personnel
 Laurie Anderson – package design
 Neil Einstman – assistant engineer
 Janie Fricke – producer, A&R direction
 Chuck Haines – engineer, mixing
 Dave Hieronymus – engineer, mixing
 Ed Keeley – executive producer, A&R direction, mixing
 Tony Migliore – associate producer
 Gary Rice – digital mastering

Release history

References

1992 albums
Albums produced by Janie Fricke
Janie Fricke albums